The GAA Hurling All-Ireland Intermediate Club Championship, known simply as the All-Ireland Club Championship, is an annual inter-county hurling competition organised by the Gaelic Athletic Association (GAA). It is the second highest inter-county club hurling competition in Ireland, and has been contested every year since the 2004-05 championship.

The final, currently held on the third Saturday in January, is the culmination of a series of games played between October and January with the winners receiving the cup. The All-Ireland Championship has always been played on a straight knockout basis whereby once a team loses they are eliminated from the championship. Currently qualification is limited to teams competing in the Connacht Championship, the Leinster Championship, the Munster Championship and the Ulster Championship.

Four teams currently participate in the All-Ireland semi-finals. The most successful teams are from Kilkenny – seven different Kilkenny clubs have won the All-Ireland title on seven separate occasions.

The title has been won by 16 different clubs, none of whom have won the title more than once. Naas are the current holders after overcoming Kilmoyley on a 0-16 to 1-11 scoreline in the 2021–22 All-Ireland Intermediate Club Hurling Championship final.

History

While the senior championship had been running since the 1970-71 season, the creation of an All-Ireland series at intermediate level was a natural progression. The Munster Council were the first to organize a provincial championship in the intermediate grade in 2003. They were followed by the other three provincial councils in 2004, with the four champions contesting an All-Ireland series. Kildangan of Tipperary were the first All-Ireland champions after defeating Carrickshock of Kilkenny.

The championship has been dominated by Kilkenny clubs, with Dicksboro, St. Lachtain's, Clara, Rower-Inistioge and Bennettsbridge claiming All-Ireland titles. Dicksboro are the only team to have qualified for two All-Ireland finals. In 2007, London club Robert Emmetts became the first team from outside of Ireland to claim an All-Ireland title.

Qualification

The GAA Hurling All-Ireland Intermediate Club Championship features four teams in the final tournament. 25 county champions contest the four provincial intermediate club championships with the four respective champions qualifying for the All-Ireland series. Prior to 2018 the London champions entered the competition at the quarter-final stage, but now compete in the Connacht championship.

List of Finals

Roll of Honour

Performances by club

Performances by county

Performances by province

See also
 Munster Intermediate Club Hurling Championship
 Leinster Intermediate Club Hurling Championship
 Connacht Intermediate Club Hurling Championship
 Ulster Intermediate Club Hurling Championship
 All-Ireland Senior Club Hurling Championship
 All-Ireland Junior Club Hurling Championship
 All-Ireland Junior B Club Hurling Championship
 All-Ireland Senior Club Camogie Championship

References

 
Intermediate